The Schneeferner in the Bavarian Alps is Germany's highest and largest glacier.

Geography 
Schneeferner glacier is located on the Zugspitzplatt, a plateau south of the country's highest peak, the Zugspitze, that descends from west to east and forms the head of the Reintal valley. The meltwaters from the glacier seep away into the karstified plateau and surface again in the Reintal, where they feed the River Partnach. The Schneeferner is one of the northernmost glaciers in the Alps.

History 
In the 19th century, towards the end of the Little Ice Age, a large glacier, the Plattachferner, covered almost the entire Zugspitzplatt between the Jubiläumsgrat arête and the Plattspitzen peaks.

During its retreat, the glacier split into a northern and a southern section towards the end of the 19th century. Later, the so-called Eastern or Little Schneeferner below the summit of the Zugspitze broke away from the northern section and has since totally disappeared.

Thereafter the glacier's retreat was less drastic and the remaining sections of the Northern Schneeferner tended to just shrink in thickness due to their location in a basin. In the 1960s  and 1970s,  favourable conditions even led to a growth in the thickness of the glacier.

Since 1980 the glaciers on the Zugspitzplatt have again been on the retreat.

Since 1990, global warming has seen consistently above-average summer temperatures recorded on the Zugspitze. Summer snowfalls have become increasingly rare, which damages glaciers, because such snowfalls decrease the energy absorbed by glaciers and interrupt melting processes by increasing their albedo. About  of ice melted has melted annually, on average. If this rate of melting continues, the glaciers on the Zugspitze will disappear between 2015 and 2030, although a few small remnants of ice may survive longer.

Northern Schneeferner 

It flows from west to east with a gentle gradient, especially in its lower reaches. North of the glacier is the arête running from the Zugspitze to the Zugspitzeck; in the west it almost reaches the wide Schneefernerscharte (Schneeferner wind gap). To the east and south it is open; even the Schneefernerkopf mountain to the southwest offers very little shade.

The glacier is mainly fed by precipitation falling directly onto its surface; it is also supplied with snow from avalanches that sweep down from the rocks of the Zugspitzeck and the Schneefernerkopf. On the steep flanks of the Schneefernerkopf the flow rate can be several metres per year, but here the glacier has all but disappeared in recent years; its remnants are covered by gravel and very little accumulation takes place.

Exploitation of the glacier 
Today, the Northern Schneeferner is a winter sports area. Since 1955, five ski lifts have been built on the ice sheet, making it the only German glacier skiing area. At one time summer skiing was also possible here. In order to better support winter sports, the natural evolution of the glacier has been counteracted by transporting snow from surrounding areas. As a result, since 1990 the ice thickness has occasionally increased.

Since 1993, certain areas of the glacier have been covered with tarpaulins during the summer to protect the winter ice and snow from sunshine and rain. In 2007,  covered 2.6% of the glacier compared to  previously. By doing so it is hoped that the exposure of rocks that could hamper winter sports can be delayed as long as possible. Although preference is given to covering the areas in which glacial melting under natural conditions would be the fastest, these measures have had little effect on the life of the glacier to date.  The ice obtained only compensates for about 1% of the loss that is expected in the unprotected areas of the glacier. In 2010, an area  was covered by the Bavarian Zugspitze Railway Company, primarily to protect the winter sports areas.

Record summer of 2003 
In August 2003 the melting of the glacier produced  of water daily, roughly one tenth of the average water consumption of the Munich region. Experts describe this melting of ice as Gletscherrauschen ("glacier rushing"), which produces meltwater streams.

Northern Schneeferner in figures 
 Area:  (as at 2006)
 Elevation: , average  (as at 2006)
 Average ice thickness:  (as at November 2006)
 Maximum ice thickness: 52 m (as at November 2006)
 Volume:  (as at November 2006)
 Maximum length: 
 Average gradient: 14°

Southern Schneeferner 

The Southern Schneeferner (Südlicher Schneeferner) once covered the entire southwestern part of the Zugspitzplatt. At the end of the 20th century the glacier had split up into a southeastern part below the Wetterwandeck and a northwestern area below the  Wetterspitzen, which later divided into the last remaining large sheet of ice and several smaller firn fields. These remnants can no longer be described as a glacier and they may melt completely within a few years. In the summer of 2022, the Bavarian Academy of Sciences officially revoked the Southern Schneeferner's classification as a glacier, citing the overall loss of coverage, thickness and movement of ice.

The Southern Schneeferner in figures 
 Area:  (as at September 2022)
 Elevation: , average  (as at 2022)
 Average ice thickness:  (as at September 2022)
 Maximum ice thickness:  (as at September 2022)

References

External links 
 Archive of Bavarian glaciers 
 Webcams of the Zugspitze (which periodically scan the glacier)

Glaciers of Bavaria
Glaciers of the Alps
GSchneeferner 
Wetterstein